Qualifications for Men's artistic gymnastics competitions at the 2010 Commonwealth Games will be held at the Indira Gandhi Arena on 4 October.

Subdivision 1

Teams

Individuals

Subdivision 2

Teams

Individuals

References

Gymnastics at the 2010 Commonwealth Games